Markel is a given name and surname. Notable people with the name include:

Given name 

Markel Bergara, Basque footballer currently playing for Getafe
Markel Brown (born 1992), American basketball player in the Israeli Basketball Premier League
Markel Irizar, Basque professional cyclist
Markel Olano, Basque politician
Markel Robles, Basque footballer
Markel Susaeta, Basque footballer currently playing for Athletic Bilbao

Surname 

Gregory Markel, American musician
Howard Markel, American medical historian
Lester Markel, American journalist and editor
Parker Markel, American baseball player

See also
Markell, given name and surname
Markelle, given name
Markle (disambiguation)